Froggatt may refer to

Places 
 Froggatt, Derbyshire, a village in the Derbyshire Dales district, England
 Froggatt Crescent, in Croydon, New South Wales, Australia, named for Walter Wilson Froggatt

People
 Jack Froggatt (1922–1993), English football player
 Joanne Froggatt (born 1980), British actress
 Kathryn Froggatt,  member of the band Wheatus
 Sir Leslie Froggatt (1920–2010), British-born Australian businessman
 Peter Froggatt (academic) (born 1928), British doctor and academic
 Raymond Froggatt (born 1941), British singer
 Redfern Froggatt (1924–2003), English football player
 Steve Froggatt (born 1973), English football player
 Walter Wilson Froggatt (1858–1937), Australian geologist and economic entomologist

Awards
 The Froggatt prize for Science at the Presbyterian Ladies' College, Sydney
 The Froggatt Awards, awarded by the Invasive Species Council of Australia.

Species
Named in honour of Walter Wilson Froggatt:
 Acacia froggattii, an Australian tree species
 Adlerzia froggatti, an Australian ant species
 Anonychomyrma froggatti, a species of ant
 Aprostocetus froggatti, a species of hymenopteran
 Australaethina froggatti, the kurrajong pod beetle, an Australian beetle.
 Bactrocera froggatti, a species of fruit fly
 Camponotus froggatti, a species of carpenter ant
 Ceratognathus froggatti, a stag beetle
 Cicindela froggatti, a species of beetle
 Eucalyptus froggattii, an Australian tree species
 Froggatt's catfish (Cinetodus froggatti), a species of fish that is endemic to Australia
 Haplothrips froggatti, a species of thrips
 Leptomyrmex froggatti, a species of ant
 Myrmecia froggatti, a species of ant
 Phylacteophaga froggatti, a species of sawfly
 Pleistodontes froggatti, an Australian fig wasp
 Pseuduvaria froggattii, an Australian plant species
 Solenopsis froggatti'', a species of fire ant